The Road was a rock band that was formed in 1967. They had a hit in Greece with a cover of the Zombies song "She's Not There". They released further singles on the Kama Sutra label. They broke up in the 1970s.

History
The group origins can be traced to Buffalo, New York, where they started out in 1967 as The Mellow Brick Road. The original line-up was vocalists Phil and Jerry Hudson, bassist Joe Hesse, keyboardist Jim Hesse,  guitarist Ralph Parker, and drummer Nick DiStefano. They released a single on the United Artists label, "Don't Put All Your Eggs In One Basket".

The group had a hit with She's Not There", which was released on Kama Sutra. By that time the group had become The Road. It sold in excess of 200,000 copies and registered at #88 in Cashbox, and managed to reach the charts in Greece.

Their album simply titled Road was released about a week before Christmas 1969. The 12 track album included "She's Not There", "A Taste of Honey", "Dance to the Music", "Never Gonna Give You Up", "Rock & Roll Woman", and "Mr. Soul", their latest single. By mid-February 1970, it had sold well in excess of 25,000 copies.

As of February 1970, the group was managed by Fred Saia. The line-up at the time consisted of band leader Jerry Hudson, Ralph Parker, Nick DiStefano, Joe Hesse, Phil Hudson, Jim Hesse and Larry Rizzuto, who had recently joined the band.

In 1971, their double album Cognition was released on Kama Sutra KSBS 2032. The reviewer noted the Scientology content with the music. A good deal of the material was composed by the band members.

They broke up in 1972.

Jerry Hudson, the lead singer recorded a solo single "Gillian Frank" bw "I'll Feel A Whole Lot Better", and it was released on the Bandstand Records label in 1972, also the Big Tree label in early 1973. Billboard reported in its February 10, 1973 issue that the single was bubbling under the Hot 100 at #117, and stayed there for another week.

Jerry Hudson (born Gerald K. Hudson Jr. on December 4, 1948 in Buffalo) died on November 4, 2019, at age 70. Last November, he had been hospitalized following a stroke.

Releases

References

External links
 Top Shelf Oldies: The Road by Gary E. Myers
 Joe Hesse Music: The Road
 WNYFM 45 Friday: THE ROAD – She’s Not There
 The Road / The Mellow Brick Road

Musical groups from Buffalo, New York
Musical groups established in 1968
Kama Sutra Records artists